Stracciatella (in Italian, a diminutive derived from the verb  ("to shred"), meaning "a little shred"), also known as stracciatella alla romana, is an Italian soup consisting of meat broth and small shreds of an egg-based mixture, prepared by drizzling the mixture into boiling broth and stirring. It is popular around Rome in the Lazio region of central Italy. A similar soup, called zanzarelli, was described by Martino da Como in his 15th century manual  The Art of Cooking. Other variants exist.

Description

Traditionally stracciatella alla romana used to be served at the start of Easter lunches. Stracciatella alla romana is traditionally prepared by beating eggs and mixing in grated Parmesan cheese, salt, pepper, nutmeg, lemon zest, and sometimes semolina; this mixture is then gently drizzled into boiling meat broth, while stirring so as to produce little shreds ("stracciatelle") of cooked egg in the soup. The resulting soup can be served in bowls containing a few thin slices of toasted bread, with additional parmesan grated on top.

According to Ada Boni, stracciatella alla romana used also to be scented with marjoram. Other traditional Italian and Italian-American recipes suggest garnishing with chopped parsley. Some American variations of the soup incorporate spinach as a main ingredient.

A recipe for a spicy soup made with eggs and broth that bears similarities to the modern-day stracciatella was recorded as early as the 15th century by Martino da Como in his Libro de Arte Coquinaria (The Art of Cooking) under the name of zanzarelli.  The traditional preparation of stracciatella is also rather similar to that of sciusceddu, a rich festive soup from Messina in Sicily that may be a cousin of the Roman dish.

Legacy
Stracciatella soup inspired the gelato (Italian ice-cream) flavour of the same name, which was created in 1961 by a restaurateur in the northern town of Bergamo, who claimed he had grown tired of stirring eggs into broth to satisfy customers from Rome.

See also

 Egg drop soup
 List of Italian soups
 List of soups

Notes and references

Explanatory notes

References 

Cuisine of Abruzzo
Cuisine of Lazio
Cuisine of Marche
Egg dishes
Italian soups